Trollin Lake is a lake in Isanti County, in the U.S. state of Minnesota.

Trollin Lake was named for a pioneer blacksmith who settled there.

See also
List of lakes in Minnesota

References

Lakes of Minnesota
Lakes of Isanti County, Minnesota